Clover is an unincorporated community in Roane County, West Virginia, United States.

The community took its name from nearby Clover Creek.

References

Unincorporated communities in Roane County, West Virginia
Unincorporated communities in West Virginia